The 2013 Chesapeake Bayhawks season was the 13th season for the Chesapeake Bayhawks of Major League Lacrosse. The Bayhawks concluded the year with a 9–5 record, good for 2nd place in the MLL and defeated the Charlotte Hounds 10–9 in the MLL Championship Game to win the franchise's fifth Steinfeld Cup.

Season

Regular season

Playoffs

Standings

References

External links

Chesapeake Bayhawks seasons
Chesapeake Bayhawks
Chesapeake Bayhawks